Robert Nathan (1894–1985) was an American novelist and poet.

Robert Nathan may also refer to:
Robert Nathan (intelligence officer) (1868–1921), British intelligence official active in India and the United States
Robert R. Nathan (1908–2001), American economist
Robert Stuart Nathan (born 1948), American television writer and producer